Delaware Shakespeare (formerly known as "Delaware Shakespeare Festival") is an outdoor Shakespeare festival that takes place during the summer months at Rockwood Park located in the city of Wilmington, Delaware. The mission of the Delaware Shakespeare is to create professional theatre and educational programs in order to further the understanding and appreciation of Shakespeare’s works for the residents and friends of the State of Delaware.

Production History 
Source:

Summer Festival at Archmere Academy
 2003: A Midsummer Night’s Dream
 2004: As You Like It
 2005: Love’s Labour’s Lost

Summer Festival at Rockwood Park:
 2006: Much Ado About Nothing
 2007: Richard III
 2008: Romeo and Juliet
 2009: Twelfth Night
 2010: Macbeth
 2011: The Winter’s Tale
 2012: A Midsummer Night’s Dream
 2013: The Two Gentlemen of Verona
 2014: Hamlet
 2015: The Taming of the Shrew
 2016: The Comedy of Errors
 2017: Henry V
 2018: Much Ado About Nothing

Community Tour
 2016: Pericles, Prince of Tyre
 2017: As You Like It
 2018: The Merchant of Venice

Education and outreach

Shakespeare, Then, Now and Always 

Originally piloted in 2004, the Shakespeare, Then, Now and Always program is an interactive seminar for local high school students. One of the Festival's Shakespearean scholars visits local high school classrooms to work with students on reading, speaking and understanding the works of the Bard.

The Bridge to Shakespeare’s Masterpiece 

Following the performance, a panel of DSF scholars and actors meet with the participants to review the themes of the play, discuss the world of Shakespeare and find connections to the modern world and to their own lives.

History 

The Delaware Shakespeare Festival was founded in 2003 by Molly Cahill and Greg Robleto and performed for three years on the grounds of or in the auditorium at Archmere Academy in Claymont. In 2006, the Festival moving to its current outdoor only location in Rockwood Park in Wilmington. In 2011, the Festival began taking productions on tour to other destinations in Delaware, starting with a free showing of the play at The Freeman Stage at Bayside in Fenwick Island.

References

External links

 Delaware Today magazine
 Theatre Alliance of Greater Philadelphia
 Sussex Countian newspaper
 Greater Wilmington Convention & Visitor's Bureau

Shakespeare festivals in the United States
Festivals in Delaware
Wilmington, Delaware
Annual events in Delaware
Recurring events established in 2003
2003 establishments in Delaware